Lauren Davis (born October 9, 1993) is an American professional tennis player. Known for her aggressive backhand, speed, and clay-court strength, she has won two singles titles on the WTA Tour and reached a career-high singles ranking of world No. 26, in May 2017. She has also won eight singles titles on the ITF Women's Circuit.

Early life
Davis was born on 9 October 1993 in Gates Mills, Ohio. She began playing tennis at age nine. Upon turning 16, she left her hometown for training at the Evert Tennis Academy. Davis' parents both work in the medical profession. Her mother is a nurse and still resides in Gates Mills, and her father, William Davis, a well known author of “Wheat Belly”, is a cardiologist working in Wisconsin.

Junior career

Davis reached a career-high ranking of No. 3 as a junior. She made her debut on the ITF Junior Circuit in September 2008 at the age of 14, via wildcard at the 2008 US Open, losing to Ajla Tomljanović.

She started 2009 season with a third-round appearance at the Grade-1 tournament in Carson, California, after which she won her first singles junior tournament, a Grade-3 International Grass Court Championships in Philadelphia, when she defeated Brooke Bolender in three sets. By the end of the 2009, she made a quarterfinal appearance at the US Open, won a Grade-1 Yucatán World Cup in Mérida on the hardcourt and made a third-round loss at the Orange Bowl.

In 2010, Davis reached one quarterfinal in the first four months, before reaching the final of the Easter Bowl, losing to Krista Hardebeck. She again lost a final, this time in the 51st Trofeo Bonfiglio to Beatrice Capra. In November 2010, she went on an 18-match winning streak, winning the Grade-1 tournaments Yucatán World Cup and the Eddie Herr youth tournament, as well as the Grade-A Orange Bowl event.

While still a junior, Davis won her first professional title on clay at a USTA tournament in Williamsburg, Virginia in 2010. She then went on a 27-match win streak, and won her second pro title in Puerto Rico. She ended her junior career with a third-round appearance at the 2011 Australian Open.

Professional career

2011: Turning professional

Davis was awarded a wildcard into the Australian Open, where she lost her first Grand Slam appearance against fifth-seeded Samantha Stosur in the first round. She officially turned professional in 2011 and won her first WTA Tour match in the Miami Open qualifying by beating Jill Craybas, in three sets. She then lost to Anastasiya Yakimova.

In the qualifying for the Charleston Open, Davis lost to Stéphanie Foretz. While waiting to give a post-match interview in a corporate booth, she was knocked unconscious when lighting equipment fell on her head. She suffered a concussion that kept her out of competition for months and left her suffering from occasional migraines for several months after that.

In October 2013, Davis filed a lawsuit against Production Design Associates and High Output, who had been hired by sponsors Dove to provide and install video and lighting equipment for the interview booths. Her complaint stated:

She sought actual and punitive damages for negligence and gross negligence.

2012: French Open debut & first major match win
At the Indian Wells Open, she defeated Petra Martić in the first round and then lost to Nadia Petrova in the round of 64. She then lost in the first round of the Miami Open to Vera Dushevina.

Davis made it through the qualifying rounds of the French Open, where she won her first major main-draw match against 30th seed Mona Barthel, in straight sets. In the second round, she lost to compatriot Christina McHale, in straight sets.

2013: Miami Open 3rd round

Davis reached her second career quarterfinal at the Hobart International, where she lost to Sloane Stephens. In February, she won the United States Tennis Association (USTA) Dow Classic title by defeating Alja Tomljanović in the final. 

She replaced an injured Victoria Azarenka at the Miami Open, where she defeated Madison Keys in the second round. In the third round, she faced Alizé Cornet and lost in three sets. During the match, Davis was stung on the buttocks by a wasp in the third set. Though it caused her significant pain, Davis refused to blame her loss on it. The overwhelming heat affected Davis and Cornet as both players left the court in wheelchairs.

Davis then reached the quarterfinals of the Monterrey Open, where she lost to the eventual champion, Anastasia Pavlyuchenkova. She was knocked out in the first round of the French Open, Wimbledon and the US Open. Her furthest advance for the remainder of the year was a quarterfinal appearance at the Bell Challenge in September, where she lost to Lucie Šafářová.

2014: Two major 3rd rounds, Indian Wells 4th round, top 50

At the Australian Open, Davis beat Julia Görges to advance to the third round of a Grand Slam tournament for the first time. There, she was defeated by Eugenie Bouchard.

At the Indian Wells Open, Davis defeated world No. 4, Victoria Azarenka, in the second round, marking her first victory over a top-10 player and a Grand Slam champion. She then defeated Varvara Lepchenko, but withdrew in the fourth round due to illness. At the Miami Open, she won her first-round match against Zhang Shuai, but lost in the second round to Ana Ivanovic. Following an early exit at the French Open, she advanced to the quarterfinals of the Eastbourne International, where she lost to Madison Keys.

At the Wimbledon Championships, Davis upset Flavia Pennetta in straight sets and advanced to the third round of the tournament for the first time. She ended the year ranked world No. 57.

2015: First WTA semifinal
Davis reached the semifinals of the Auckland Open, her greatest success in a WTA tournament at the time, before she lost to Venus Williams. Following the conclusion of the early hardcourt season, she entered the Family Circle Cup in Charleston. Playing on clay, one of her best surfaces, she avenged her loss to Eugenie Bouchard at the previous year's Australian Open, defeating her in straight sets. She then advanced to the third round against Mona Barthel, who retired from the match while down a set. Davis exited the tournament in the quarterfinals.

2016: First two WTA finals
Davis reached her first WTA final at the Washington Open, where she was runner-up against Yanina Wickmayer. She reached her second career final at the Canadian Coupe Banque Nationale in September, and was runner-up to Océane Dodin.

2017: Ascent into top 30, Auckland title, Fed Cup champion

Davis won her first WTA title at the Auckland Open, defeating Ana Konjuh in the final. She also reached the quarterfinals of the Qatar Ladies Open in Doha as a qualifier and the Dubai Tennis Championships. As a result, she achieved a new career high of 37. Steve Tignor of Tennis.com noted, "Lauren Davis is playing the tennis of her life."

She reached the fourth round of the Indian Wells Open, equalling her result in 2014. She was also part of the United States team that reached the Fed Cup final with a victory over the Czech Republic.

Playing her first red clay-court tournament of the year, she easily advanced to the quarterfinals of the Morocco Open in Rabat, winning each of her victories in straight sets, before dropping a three-set match to Anastasia Pavlyuchenkova. In May, she reached a new career-best ranking of world No. 26. However, she lost in the first round of all four Grand Slam tournaments in 2017, including defeats to fellow Americans Varvara Lepchenko at Wimbledon and Sofia Kenin at the US Open, and by the end of the year her singles ranking had dropped to 48.

2018: Third Australian Open 3rd round 
To start the year, Davis was unable to defend her title at the Auckland Open after losing to compatriot Sachia Vickery in the first round. Nonetheless, she put together an excellent tournament at the Australian Open, matching her career-best result at a Grand Slam event, after not winning a match at any of the four majors the previous year. In the third round, she pushed world No. 1, Simona Halep, to a nearly four-hour match, losing 13–15 in the third set and tying the tournament record for most games played in a match at 48.

2019: Wimbledon 3rd round, first top-10 win since 2017

In May, Davis beat Ann Li to win the inaugural ITF FineMark Championship event at Bonita Springs. In doing so, she qualified as a wildcard for the French Open, where she beat Kristýna Plíšková, in straight sets in the first round, before losing in three sets to Johanna Konta.

At Wimbledon, Davis lost in the final round of qualifying to Kristie Ahn, but entered the main draw as a lucky loser. She beat Kateryna Kozlova in the first round in straight sets. In the second, she defeated the defending champion and fifth seed Angelique Kerber, in three sets. Davis recovered from an injury break after losing the first set and ended the match with 45 winners to Kerber's 15, winning 12 of the last 15 games to claim her first top-10 victory since 2017 and only the fourth in her career. Her run was then ended by Carla Suárez Navarro, in the third round.

Davis advanced to the quarterfinals of the Washington Open, where she lost to the eventual champion, Jessica Pegula. At the Cincinnati Open, Venus Williams snapped a four match losing-streak by defeating Davis in the first round. At the US Open, Davis beat Johanna Larsson in straight sets but was eliminated in the second round by Ashleigh Barty.

2020-2021: Limited play during COVID-pandamic, loss of form
In August 2021, Davis entered the main draw at the US Open, where she defeated lucky loser Viktoriya Tomova in the first round in three sets, before losing to sixth seed Bianca Andreescu.

At the Indian Wells Open, she reached also the second round defeating Nuria Parrizas-Diaz before retiring against 22nd seed compatriot Danielle Collins.

2022: US Open & second Miami Open 3rd rounds, back to top 100
Although she entered the quarterfinals at the Adelaide International 2 and the third round at the Miami Open as a qualifier and rose to No. 82 on 4 April 2022, she dropped out of the top 100 to No. 102, on 9 May 2022. At Wimbledon, she defeated Madison Brengle in the first round, before exiting in three sets to Amanda Anisimova.

At the US Open, she reached the third round for the first time by defeating the 28th seed Ekaterina Alexandrova, before losing to the world No. 1, Iga Swiatek. As a result, she returned to the top 100, rising close to ten positions in the rankings to No. 94 on 12 September 2022.

2023: Second WTA singles title, back to top 50
Davis began her season at the Auckland Open, where she defeated Tamara Zidanšek before losing to Danka Kovinić in the second round. She then entered the Hobart International ranked No. 84, qualifying for the main draw with wins over Kamilla Rakhimova and Kateryna Baindl. She went on to defeat Sloane Stephens, Ysaline Bonaventure, Wang Xinyu, and Anna Blinkova to reach her first WTA final since Auckland in 2017. She defeated Elisabetta Cocciaretto in the final to claim the second WTA Tour title of her career. She did not drop a set throughout the entire tournament, and became just the fourth qualifier in the tournament's history to lift the trophy. As a result she returned to the top 60 at world No. 57 on 16 January 2023.

She then faced Kovinić again in the Australian Open, winning in three sets before losing to Elise Mertens in the second round, but rose further to No. 48 in the rankings on 30 January 2023.

Playing style

Davis is primarily known for her backhand, quickness, and clay-court abilities.

While analyzing Davis's game, Mike Whalley of the BBC labeled her backhand "a big weapon," while E.J. Crawford of US Open.org described it as "terrific", likening her style to that of Amanda Coetzer. On offense, Davis hits deep ground strokes to move opponents backward, often setting up her backhand as a finishing shot. While playing on hardcourts, she will usually draw opponents forward and attempt cross-court winners, or send serves wide and hit backhands down the line.

Davis is also noted for her backhand defense. At the 2015 Family Circle Cup, she returned a 102-mph serve from Eugenie Bouchard with a backhand winner. During their 2014 meeting, Victoria Azarenka repeatedly lost points while attacking Davis's backhand up the middle of the court—including on match point—allowing Davis to create angles. While discussing Davis in an interview, Christina McHale noted, "You don't get free points with her very often", and described her backhand as "very tough".

In a 2015 article, WTATennis.com noted Davis's "speed and court coverage", while the BBC recognized her for "whizzing round the court." Following her victory at the Auckland Open in 2017, Michael Burgess of The New Zealand Herald declared "only David Ferrer and Michael Chang are comparable to her ability to make an opponent play another shot." During Davis's final junior year, Mary Joe Fernández commended her "speed, quickness, competitiveness and heart."

Her first professional title came on clay at a USTA tournament in 2010. In contrast to some of her American peers, who have been perceived as being uncomfortable on the surface, Davis is recognized for her skill on slow courts. Following her second-round win at the 2015 Family Circle Cup, WTATennis.com labeled her performance "a clay-court masterclass." While discussing the surface, Davis noted: "I think clay really works for me, because I'm pretty fast. I can slide really well and I can make a lot of balls, so it really works for me." Davis has named hard-court as her other favorite surface.

Performance timelines

Only main-draw results in WTA Tour, Grand Slam tournaments, Fed Cup/Billie Jean King Cup and Olympic Games are included in win–loss records.

Singles
Current through the 2023 Dubai Open.

Doubles

WTA career finals

Singles: 4 (2 titles, 2 runner-ups)

WTA Challenger finals

Singles: 1 (runner-up)

ITF Circuit finals

Singles: 13 (8 titles, 5 runner–ups)

Fed Cup performance

Singles (0–2)

Doubles (1–0)

WTA Tour career earnings
as of December 2021

Head-to-head records

Record against top ten players
Davis's record against players who have been ranked in the top 10. Active players are in boldface.

Top 10 wins

Notes

References

External links

 
 
 

1993 births
Living people
American female tennis players
People from Gates Mills, Ohio
Sportspeople from Cuyahoga County, Ohio
Tennis people from Ohio
Tennis players at the 2015 Pan American Games
Pan American Games competitors for the United States
21st-century American women